Carlo Maria Giudici (1723 in Viggiù – 1804 in Milan) was an Italian painter. He was born in Viggiù and became a professor at the Brera Academy of Milan. Among his pupils were Giovanni Battista Riccardi, il Sala, and Andrea Appiani.

References

1723 births
1817 deaths
18th-century Italian painters
Italian male painters
19th-century Italian painters
Painters from Milan
Academic staff of Brera Academy
19th-century Italian male artists
18th-century Italian male artists